Billie Irwin is a former netball player who played for the New Zealand national netball team when it won the 1967 World Netball Championships.

Netball career
Billie Irwin was born on 10 May 1942. She played netball for Rotorua, as one of a formidable defensive pairing with Tilly Vercoe, which was known as "Billie and Tilly". The coach of Rotorua was Taini Jamison and she picked the pair to be in the national team when she became its head coach. Beating Australia 40-34 in its final match, New Zealand won the 1967 world championships in Perth, Australia, its first win in the world championships. Irwin and Vercoe came to be known as "The Black Wall", because of their defending and the colours worn by the team.

References

External links
 1967 World Cup game between New Zealand and Australia

New Zealand international netball players
1967 World Netball Championships players
Living people
1942 births